Paradrillia rougeyroni is a species of sea snail, a marine gastropod mollusk in the family Horaiclavidae.

There is a remarkable similarity with Drillia barkliensis H. Adams, 1869 (synonym: Drillia rougeyroni (Souverbie in Souverbie & Montrouzier, 1874) )

Description
The length of the shell attains 30 mm.

Distribution
This marine species occurs in the Pacific Ocean off the Loyalty Islands

References

External links
 

rougeyroni
Gastropods described in 1874